Charles Slichter may refer to:

 Charles S. Slichter (1864–1946), mathematician and physicist
 Charles Pence Slichter (1924–2018), American physicist